2-Chlorobenzonitrile is an organic compound with the formula ClC6H4CN.  It is a white solid.  The compound, one of three isomers of chlorobenzonitrile, is produced industrially by ammoxidation of 2-chlorotoluene. The compound is of commercial interest as a precursor to 2-amino-5-nitrobenzonitrile, a precursor to dyes.

References

Benzonitriles
Chlorobenzenes